Annie Powell (1906–1986) was a Welsh Communist politician.

Born in Rhondda and educated at Pentre Higher Grade  School, Powell became interested in politics while at Glamorgan Training College, Barry, in the 1920s. It was while undertaking taking teacher training during the period of the 1926 General Strike that Annie Powell first became interested in politics and when she started teaching at Trebanog she witnessed the great degree of poverty faced by the schoolchildren and their families: "The poverty of the children hit me really hard". She joined the Labour Party, but was impressed by the emphasis laid on theory and action by the Communist Party of Great Britain (CPGB). After long consideration, she put aside her non-conformist religious background and joined the CPGB in 1938.

She remained a teacher and became active in the National Union of Teachers, while contesting Rhondda East for the party at several general elections from 1955. At the general election of 1959 she secured 4,580 votes.  Powell was not only a Welsh speaker but also taught in Welsh. She sat on the Welsh Committee of the CPGB, and at one time was its women's organiser. In 1960, she was a CPGB delegate at a major conference of Communist parties in Moscow, where she claimed to have impressed Nikita Khrushchev with her rendition of "Hen Wlad fy Nhadau", the national anthem of Wales. Perhaps as a result of this meeting, she became a supporter of Khrushchev's ideas within the CPGB.

In 1955, after thirteen attempts, Powell was elected as a Communist councillor for Penygraig, losing in 1957. In 1961, Powell was re-elected as a councillor in Rhondda. She served on the council for the next twenty years, and in 1979 was appointed mayor. As such, she is often said to have been Britain's only Communist mayor, although Finlay Hart had held an equivalent post as provost in Clydebank and Joe Vaughan in Bethnal Green can also claim to be the first Communist mayor in Britain.

She stated in one interview that she had learnt valuable lessons from such Communists as Arthur Horner, Harry Pollitt, Will Paynter, Jack Davies, and the South Walian Jack Jones.

References
BBC - Wales On Air - Annie Powell
Annie Powell - Rhondda Communist
Annie Powell (obituary), The New York Times
Graham Stevenson, Compendium of Communist Biography

1906 births
1986 deaths
Women mayors of places in Wales
Communist Party of Great Britain councillors
Mayors of places in Wales
People from Rhondda
Welsh communists
Welsh schoolteachers
Women councillors in Wales